Simon Verity (born 1945) is a British sculptor and master stonecarver.  Much of his work has been garden sculpture. He has works in the private collections of King Charles III, Sir Elton John, and Lord Rothschild.

Career

Verity received his training through an informal apprenticeship to Oliver Hill and through Robert Baker's teaching at Wells Cathedral.

A 1988 memorial by Verity for the writer Sophie Behrens was the catalyst for the creation of Memorials by Artists, an organization dedicated to the creation of unique memorials.

From 1988 until 1997 Verity worked as Director on the carving of the west portal of the Cathedral of Saint John the Divine, New York (also known as the Portal of Paradise). At the start, Verity was assisted by six apprentices. In 1993, Jean-Claude Marchionni, a master stonecarver from France, joined Verity in the project. A procession of 32 matriarchs and patriarchs from the Old and New Testaments were carved from blocks of limestone already in place.

In 2004, Verity was commissioned to design and build a hand-carved map of the United Kingdom to form the paving for the British Memorial Garden in New York's Hanover Square. The Garden commemorates the 67 British victims of the September 11, 2001 attack on the World Trade Center. The map features all the counties of Great Britain, as well as the boroughs of London and British Islands and protectorates.  The map is carved from grey flagstone from Caithness, and sandstone from Moray, Scotland.

In January 2015, Verity visited Duke University for a 10-day residency during which he recreated the Head of a virtue, a 1245 sculpture from Notre-Dame Cathedral that is now in the collection of the Nasher Museum of Art.

Works

Other works include:
Portland stone carved baptismal font at Clifton Cathedral, Bristol (1973)
Figures in niches on the tower of St Mary's Church, Purton, Wiltshire (1973)
An angel with lute at Exeter Cathedral
 A seated nude for the National Trust at Kiftsgate Court, Gloucestershire
 A fountain at Barnsley House, Gloucestershire
 A grotto at Leeds Castle, Kent
 Lettering for the entrance to the Henry Cole Wing of the Victoria and Albert Museum, London
 Tombstones for Sir John Betjeman and Nancy Mitford
 A grotto at Woody House in East Hampton, New York
 Guardian, a folly, in the Chicago Botanic Garden (1992)
 A fountain at the American Academy in Rome (1996) 
 A fountain at The Cathedral Labyrinth, a replica of the Chartres Cathedral labyrinth, at New Harmony, Indiana (1998)
 The Gorgeous Mosaic, a sculpture at Bellevue Hospital, NYC (1991)

References

External links
 The Portal Project Martha Cooper exhibit of the St John the Divine project.
 The Portal of Paradise City Lore NYC article on Verity's work at St John The Divine (1998)
 Simon Verity's "Seated Nude" at Kiftsgate Court, Cotswolds photos
 Cathedral of St. John the Divine photo of the Portal of Paradise.
 QuickTime panoramic portrait of Simon Verity at work on the paving for the British Memorial Garden. Photographed by Jonathan Greet
 Stone Carver a profile in the January 22, 1990 issue of The New Yorker. (paywall)

1945 births
Living people
British sculptors
British male sculptors